Immaculate Conception Academy is in Dasmariñas, Cavite, Philippines

Immaculate Conception Academy may also refer to:

Immaculate Conception Academy of Manila, Philippines
Immaculate Conception Academy (California), commonly known as ICA Cristo Rey Academy
Immaculate Conception Academy (Davenport, Iowa), a Catholic girls' high school 
Pontifical Academy of the Immaculate Conception, an academic honorary society, Rome
Immaculate Conception Academy–Greenhills, San Juan, Metro Manila, Philippines

See also
ICA (disambiguation)